Enea AZS Poznań is a Polish professional women's basketball club that was founded in 1919 in the city of Poznań. Enea AZS Poznań plays in the Energa Basket Liga Kobiet, the highest competition in Poland.

Titles
 Polish Championship:
 1st place (1): 1978
 2nd place (1): 1932, 2004
 3rd place (2): 1931, 1977

Current roster

References

External links
 Official Website

Women's basketball teams in Poland
Sport in Poznań
Basketball teams established in 1919